The following is a list of Drepanidae of Nepal. Sixty different species are listed.

This list is primarily based on Colin Smith's 2010 "Lepidoptera of Nepal", which is based on Toshiro Haruta's "Moths of Nepal (Vol. 1-6)" with some recent additions and a modernized classification.

Agnidra discipilaria
Agnidra specularia
Agnidra vinacea
Amphitorna olga
Auzata semipavonaria
Callidrepana argenteola
Callidrepana patrana patrana
Canucha duplexa duplexa
Canucha specularis
Deroca hidda bifida
Deroca hyalina hyalina
Deroca inconclusa
Ditrigona diana
Ditrigona furvicosta
Ditrigona media
Ditrigona mytylata
Ditrigona obliquilinea obliquilinea
Ditrigona regularis
Ditrigona sericea
Ditrigona spatulata
Ditrigona triangularia
Drapetodes mitaria
Drepana dispilata dispilata
Drepana hyalina
Drepana innotata
Drepana pallida pallida
Drepana rufofasciata
Auzatellodes hyalinata
Macrauzata fenestraria
Macrocilix mysticata mysticata
Macrocilix orbiferata orbiferata
Microblepsis leucosticta
Microblepsis prunicolor
Microblepsis violacea
Nordstromia argenticeps
Nordstromia bicostata bicostata
Nordstromia lilacina
Nordstromia vira
Oreta ancora
Oreta andreme
Oreta extensa
Oreta griseotincta griseotincta
Oreta obtusa obtusa
Oreta pavaca
Oreta sanguinea
Oreta vatama
Oreta vatama luculenta
Paralbara muscularia
Strepsigonia diluta
Teldenia vestigata
Thymistadopsis trilinearia
Thymistadopsis undulifera
Thymistida tripunctata
Tridrepana adelpha
Tridrepana albonotata
Tridrepana astralaine
Tridrepana clinata
Tridrepana flava flava
Tridrepana fulva
Tridrepana rubromarginata indica
Tridrepana sadana

See also
List of butterflies of Nepal
Odonata of Nepal
Cerambycidae of Nepal
Zygaenidae of Nepal
Wildlife of Nepal

References

 01
Drepanidae
Insects of Nepal